Cabeza de Framontanos is a village in the north-west of the province of Salamanca, western Spain, part of the autonomous community of Castile-Leon. From 1970 It belong to village Villarino de los Aires.

See also 
List of municipalities in Salamanca

Populated places in the Province of Salamanca